Area studies (also known as regional studies) are interdisciplinary fields of research and scholarship pertaining to particular geographical, national/federal, or cultural regions.  The term exists primarily as a general description for what are, in the practice of scholarship, many heterogeneous fields of research, encompassing both the social sciences and the humanities. Typical area study programs involve international relations, strategic studies, history, political science, political economy, cultural studies, languages, geography, literature, and other related disciplines. In contrast to cultural studies, area studies often include diaspora and emigration from the area.

History
Interdisciplinary area studies became increasingly common in the United States and in Western scholarship after World War II. Before that war American universities had just a few faculty who taught or conducted research on the non-Western world. Foreign-area studies were virtually nonexistent. After the war, liberals and conservatives alike were concerned about the US ability to respond effectively to perceived external threats from the Soviet Union and China in the context of the emerging Cold War, as well as to the fall-out from the decolonization of Africa and Asia.

In this context, the Ford Foundation, the Rockefeller Foundation, and the Carnegie Corporation of New York convened a series of meetings producing a broad consensus that to address this knowledge deficit, the US must invest in international studies. Therefore, the foundations of the field are strongly rooted in America.  Participants argued that a large brain trust of internationally oriented political scientists and economists was an urgent national priority. There was a central tension, however, between those who felt strongly that, instead of applying Western models, social scientists should develop culturally and historically contextualized knowledge of various parts of the world by working closely with humanists, and those who thought social scientists should seek to develop overarching macrohistorial theories that could draw connections between patterns of change and development across different geographies. The former became area-studies advocates, the latter proponents of modernization theory.

The Ford Foundation would eventually become the dominant player in shaping the area-studies program in the United States. In 1950 the foundation established the prestigious Foreign Area Fellowship Program (FAFP), the first large-scale national competition in support of area-studies training in the United States. From 1953 to 1966 it contributed $270 million to 34 universities for area and language studies. Also during this period, it poured millions of dollars into the committees run jointly by the Social Science Research Council and the American Council of Learned Societies for field-development workshops, conferences, and publication programs. Eventually, the SSRC-ACLS joint committees would take over the administration of FAFP.

Other large and important programs followed Ford's. Most notably, the National Defense Education Act of 1957, renamed the Higher Education Act in 1965, allocated funding for some 125 university-based area-studies units known as National Resource Center programs at U.S. universities, as well as for Foreign Language and Area Studies scholarships for undergraduate students and fellowships for graduate students.

Meanwhile, area studies were also developed in the Soviet Union.

Controversy within the field
Since their inception, area studies have been subject to criticism—including by area specialists themselves. Many of them alleged that because area studies were connected to the Cold War agendas of the CIA, the FBI, and other intelligence and military agencies, participating in such programs was tantamount to serving as an agent of the state. Some argue that there is the notion that US concerns and research priorities will define the intellectual terrain of area studies. Others insisted, however, that once they were established on university campuses, area studies began to encompass a much broader and deeper intellectual agenda than the one foreseen by government agencies, thus not American centric.

Arguably, one of the greatest threats to the area studies project was the rise of rational choice theory in political science and economics. To mock one of the most outspoken rational choice theory critics, Japan scholar Chalmers Johnson asked: Why do you need to know Japanese or anything about Japan's history and culture if the methods of rational choice will explain why Japanese politicians and bureaucrats do the things they do?

Following the demise of the Soviet Union, philanthropic foundations and scientific bureaucracies moved to attenuate their support for area studies, emphasizing instead interregional themes like "development and democracy". When the Social Science Research Council and the American Council of Learned Societies, which had long served as the national nexus for raising and administering funds for area studies, underwent their first major restructuring in thirty years, closing down their area committees, scholars interpreted this as a massive signal about the changing research environment.

Fields

Fields are defined differently from university to university, and from department to department, but common area-studies fields include:

Africa
 African studies
 North African studies
 Berber studies (Berberology)

Asia
 Asian studies
 Central Asian studies (see also Turkish studies)
 Mongolian studies (also under East Asian studies)
 Tibetan studies (Tibetology, also under South Asian or East Asian studies)
 Uyghur studies (also under East Asian studies)
 East Asian studies
 Chinese studies (Sinology)
 Hong Kong studies
 Pekingology
 Taiwanese studies
 Japanese studies (Japanology)
 Ainu studies
 Okinawan studies (Ryukyuan studies)
 Korean studies (Koreanology)
 North Korean studies
 Manchu studies (Manchurology)
 Miao studies (also under Southeast Asian studies)
 Mongolian studies (also under Central Asian studies)
 Tibetan studies (Tibetology, also under Central Asian or South Asian studies)
 Uyghur studies (also under Central Asian studies)
 Yi studies (also under Southeast Asian studies)
 Zhuang studies (Zhuangology, also under Southeast Asian studies)
 Middle Eastern studies (Near Eastern studies)
 Arab studies
 Caucasology (Caucasiology, also under European studies)
 Abkhaz studies
 Armenian studies (Armenology)
 Chechen studies
 Dagestan studies
 Avar studies
 Georgian studies (Kartvelian studies or Kartvelology)
 Ossetian studies
 Iranian studies (Iranology or Iranistics)
 Persian studies
 Kurdology (Kurdish studies)
 Jewish studies (Judaic studies)
 Turkish studies (Turkology or Turcology, see also Central Asian studies)
 Ottoman studies
 Seljuk studies (Seljuq studies)
 South Asian studies (Indology)
 Bengali studies
 Dravidian studies (Dravidology)
 Pakistan studies (Pakistanology)
 Sindhi studies (Sindhology)
 Tibetan studies (Tibetology, also under Central Asian or East Asian studies)
 Southeast Asian studies
 Burmese studies
 Indonesian studies
 Khmer studies
 Lao studies
 Miao studies (also under East Asian studies)
 Philippine studies (Filipinology or Philippineology)
 Thai studies
 Vietnamese studies
 Yi studies (also under East Asian studies)
 Zhuang studies (Zhuangology, also under East Asian studies)

Europe
 European studies
 Albanian studies (Albanology)
 Baltic studies (Baltic Sea Region studies)
 British studies
 Anglo-Saxon studies
 Cornish studies (also under Celtic studies)
 Manx studies (also under Celtic studies)
 Scottish studies (also under Celtic studies)
 Welsh studies (also under Celtic studies)
 Caucasology (Caucasiology, also under Middle Eastern studies)
 Abkhaz studies
 Armenology (Armenian studies)
 Chechen studies
 Dagestan studies
 Avar studies
 Georgian studies (Kartvelian studies or Kartvelology)
 Ossetian studies
 Celtic studies (Celtology)
 Breton studies
 Cornish studies (also under United Kingdom studies)
 Irish studies
 Manx studies (also under United Kingdom studies)
 Scottish studies (also under United Kingdom studies)
 Welsh studies (also under United Kingdom studies)
 Dutch studies (:nl:Neerlandistiek)
 Finnish studies
 German studies (Germanistics or Germanics)
 Austrian studies
 Hellenic studies
 Byzantine studies (Byzantinology or Byzantology)
 Hungarian studies
 Romance studies (see also Latin American studies)
 Aromanian studies
 French studies
 Occitan studies
 Iberian studies (see also Latin American studies)
 Basque studies (part of Iberian studies, but not Romance studies)
 Catalan studies
 Hispanism (Hispanic studies or Spanish studies)
 Portuguese studies
 Italian studies
 Romanian studies
 Scandinavian studies
 Slavic studies (Slavonic studies or Slavistics)
 Belarusian studies (Belarusistics)
 Bosnian studies (Bosniacistics)
 Bulgarian studies (Bulgaristics)
 Croatian studies (Croatistics)
 Czech studies (Bohemistics)
 Macedonian studies (Macedonistics)
 Montenegrin studies (Montenegristics) 
 Polish studies (Polonistics)
 Russian studies
 Soviet and communist studies
 Kremlinology
 Rusyn studies (Rusynistics)
 Serbian studies (Serbistics)
 Slovak studies (Slovakistics)
 Slovene studies (Slovenistics)
 Ukrainian studies (Ukrainistics)
 Yugoslav studies (Yugoslavistics)

America
 North and South American studies (Interamerican studies)
 American studies (in the United States this has traditionally referred primarily to North America and especially the U.S.)
 Appalachian studies
 Southern studies
 Canadian studies
 Québec studies (see also Latin American studies)
 Caribbean studies (see also Latin American studies)
 Latin American studies (see also Iberian studies, Romance studies, Caribbean studies, and Québec studies)

Oceania
 Pacific studies
Australian studies 
New Zealand studies 

Due to an increasing interest in studying translocal, transregional, transnational and transcontinental phenomena, a Potsdam-based research network has recently coined the term "TransArea Studies" (POINTS – Potsdam International Network for TransArea Studies).

Other interdisciplinary research fields such as women's studies, gender studies, disability studies, LGBT studies, and ethnic studies (including African American studies, Asian American studies, Latino studies, Chicano studies, and Native American studies) are not part of area studies but are sometimes included in discussion along with it.

Area studies is sometimes known as regional studies. The Regional Studies Association is an international association focusing on these interdisciplinary fields.

Institutions

Some entire institutions of higher education (tertiary education) are devoted solely to area studies such as School of Oriental and African Studies, part of the University of London, or the Tokyo University of Foreign Studies in Japan. At the University of Oxford, the School of Interdisciplinary Area Studies (SIAS)School of Global and Area Studies, Oxford and St Antony's College specialise in area studies, and hosts a number of post-graduate teaching programmes and research centres covering various regions of the world.
Jawaharlal Nehru University, New Delhi, is the only institution with immense contribution towards popularising area studies in India.
An institution which exclusively deals with Area Studies is the GIGA (German Institute for Global and Area Studies) in Germany.  Additionally, Lund University in Sweden offers the largest Asian Studies masters program in Northern Europe and is dedicated to promoting studies related to South Asia through its SASNet.

See also
Cultural studies 
Ethnic studies
IATIS
Interdisciplinarity
International studies
Library of Congress Country Studies
Regional geography

References

Further reading
 Kuijper, Hans (2008). "Area Studies versus Disciplines: Towards an Interdisciplinary, Systemic Country Approach". The International Journal of Interdisciplinary Social Sciences, Vol. 3, Issue 7, pp. 205–216.
 
 Schäfer, Wolf (2010). "Reconfiguring Area Studies for the Global Age." Globality Studies Journal, no. 22. 31 December 2010.

External links

Center for Interdisciplinary East and South - East Area Studies, Lund 
School of Interdisciplinary Area Studies, Oxford
 Observatory of International Research (OOIR): Latest Papers and Trends in Area Studies

Regional geography
 
Ethnography
Cultural anthropology
Humanities